DeCliff is an unincorporated community in Montgomery Township, Marion County, Ohio, United States.

References

Unincorporated communities in Marion County, Ohio